The 2011 European Cross Country Championships was the 18th edition of the cross country running competition for European athletes which was held in Velenje, Slovenia on 11 December.

Atelaw Yeshetela of Belgium won the men's title to become the country's first ever champion at the competition. The French men's team retained their title from 2010. Fionnuala Britton was the winner in the senior women's race, becoming Ireland's second champion in the history of the event after Catherina McKiernan (who won the inaugural race in 1994).
The senior women's team race was won by Great Britain.

Preparation
The city won the rights to the event at the 120th meeting of the European Athletics Council in 2007. It was the second time that Velenje hosted the event, following its hosting of the 1999 edition. The event mascot, Ligi (an anthropomorphic black mole), returned after its introduction in 1999. In the intervening years, the mascot was used for a number of events in the city and represents the importance of lignite (brown coal) in the city's economy.

Alongside international television broadcasts, European Athletics broadcast the event live on the governing body's official website.

The championships featured six races: there were senior, under-23, and under-20 junior categories for each of the sexes. The men's senior race had a 9870-metre distance, while the women's senior and men's under-23 races were held over 8040 m. The men's junior race and women's under-23 contests were over 6070 m. The junior women had a 3970 m distance to cover. The course for the competition was based near the grounds of the Atletski Klub Velenje (Velenje Athletics Club). It had a relatively flat race profile with no significant inclines and comprises two loops (a 1500 m loop and a shorter 300 m circuit).

Five European Athletics permit meetings preceded the championships on the weekend of 26–27 November: the Skanzen meeting in Budapest, the Cross de l'Acier in Leffrinckoucke, the Warandecross in Tilburg, the Lotto CrossCup van West-Vlaanderen in Roeselare, and the Cross Internacional Valle de Llodio in Llodio. These races and national-level trial events were the primary means of athletes gaining selection for the championships.

Ukraine's Serhiy Lebid returned to defend his 2010 title and the nine-time champion was the pre-race favourite. The 2010 women's champion, Jéssica Augusto, did not enter the competition as she was still recovering from her outing at the 2011 New York City Marathon. The other leading finishers from 2010 – Binnaz Uslu, Ana Dulce Félix and Fionnuala Britton – were among the favourites for the women's race.

Race results

Senior men

Totals: 76 entrants, 76 starters, 73 finishers, 10 teams.

Senior women

Totals: 54 entrants, 54 starters, 49 finishers, 8 teams.

Under-23 men

Totals: 99 entrants, 98 starters, 97 finishers, 15 teams.

Under-23 women

Totals: 43 entrants, 43 starters, 42 finishers, 6 teams.

Junior men

Totals: 114 entrants, 112 starters, 109 finishers, 19 teams.

Junior women

Totals: 93 entrants, 93 starters, 92 finishers, 16 teams.

Total medal table

Note: Totals include both individual and team medals, with medals in the team competition counting as one medal.

References

External links
Official website
Competition site on European Athletics

European Cross Country Championships
European Cross Country Championships
International athletics competitions hosted by Slovenia
2011 in Slovenian sport
Velenje
Cross country running in Slovenia
December 2011 sports events in Europe